Zamir Daudi (born 5 August 1987) is an Afghan footballer who plays as a defender who is currently playing for Viktoria Aschaffenburg .

Youth

Daudi played in the youth of 1.FSV Mainz 05 and Rot-Weiss Essen.

Career
Currently Daudi is playing for Regionalliga Bayern club Viktoria Aschaffenburg. The position that he plays on the field is right back but he also can play central defender and on the midfield.

International career
Daudi made his debut for the national team of Afghanistan during the AFC Challenge Cup 2014 in Maldives. He played all 4 matches as right defender. He wears shirtnumber 5.

References

External links
 
 

Living people
1987 births
Afghan men's footballers
Afghanistan international footballers
Rot-Weiss Frankfurt players
TGM SV Jügesheim players
Viktoria Aschaffenburg players
Association football defenders
Regionalliga players
Hessenliga players
Sportspeople from Frankfurt